The 1965 Xavier Musketeers football team was an American football team that represented Xavier University as an independent during the 1965 NCAA University Division football season. In its fourth season under head coach Ed Biles, the team compiled an 8–2 record and outscored opponents by a total of 217 to 155.

Schedule

References

Xavier
Xavier Musketeers football seasons
Xavier Musketeers football